Gergely Madarász (born 1 October 1994) is a Hungarian tennis player.

Madarász has a career high ATP singles ranking of 443 achieved on 25 July 2022. He also has a career high ATP doubles ranking of 630, achieved on 27 December 2021. Madarász has won 1 ITF singles and 2 doubles title.
 
Madarász has represented Hungary at Davis Cup, where he has a win–loss record of 3–0.

He was studied at Purdue University, between 2014-2018. He competed at the 2017 Summer Universiade. In singles Madarász lost against Indian Paras Dahiya, in doubles with Barnabás Koncz defeated on the second round by the Japanese Shintaro Imai and Kaito Uesugi.

Challenger and Futures/World Tennis Tour Finals

Singles: 8 (5-3)

Doubles 10 (5–5)

Davis Cup

Participations: (3–0)

   indicates the outcome of the Davis Cup match followed by the score, date, place of event, the zonal classification and its phase, and the court surface.

Record against other players

Madarász's match record against players who have been ranked in the top 100, with those who are active in boldface. 
ATP Tour, Challenger and Future tournaments' main draw and qualifying matches are considered.

References

External links
 
 
 
 Purdue Boilermakers bio
 

1994 births
Living people
Hungarian male tennis players
Purdue Boilermakers men's tennis players
People from Baja, Hungary
Competitors at the 2017 Summer Universiade
Sportspeople from Bács-Kiskun County
20th-century Hungarian people
21st-century Hungarian people